Lauberhorn is the longest World Cup downhill ski course in the world on the same name mountain in Wengen, Switzerland, debuted in 1930.

Course is the oldest active downhill course in the world and part of the Lauberhornrennen, the oldest ski competition in the world.

As Switzerland is and always was military neutral, downhill competitions were held even during World War II.

Downhill

Podiums

Club5+ 
In 1986, elite Club5 was originally founded by prestigious classic downhill organizers: Kitzbühel, Wengen, Garmisch, Val d’Isère and Val Gardena/Gröden, with goal to bring alpine ski sport on the highest levels possible.

Later over the years other classic longterm organizers joined the now named Club5+: Alta Badia, Cortina, Kranjska Gora, Maribor, Lake Louise, Schladming, Adelboden, Kvitfjell, St.Moritz and Åre.

References

External links

Skiing in Switzerland